Tempted is the fifth studio album by American country music artist, Marty Stuart. It was released in January 1991 by MCA Nashville. It peaked at #20 on the Top Country Albums chart. It was certified Gold in the United States and Canada. The songs, "Little Things", "'Til I Found You", "Tempted" and "Burn Me Down" were released as singles and all of them reached the top 20 on the Billboard Hot Country Songs charts. "Tempted" at #5 is the highest charting solo single of his career in the United States, although he would reach #2 in 1992 as a duet partner on Travis Tritt's "The Whiskey Ain't Workin'."

Content
Several songs on this album are covers. "I'm Blue, I'm Lonesome" was co-written by Bill Monroe and Hank Williams and was featured on Monroe's 1966 album, High Lonesome Sound of Bill Monroe. In addition, "Get Back to the Country" was released as a single in 1985 by Neil Young from his album Old Ways.

Critical reception
Jana Pendragon of Allmusic gave the album four-and-a-half stars out of five, comparing it to Dwight Yoakam's Hillbilly Deluxe in style and saying, "Stuart kicks country-pop in its well-defined hindquarters[…]But Stuart is just as deadly when he slows things down and does a ballad."

Track listing

Personnel
As listed in liner notes.
Sam Bacco - percussion, timpani
Amanda Bennett - tambourine, hand claps
Richard Bennett - acoustic guitar, electric guitar, mandolin, 6 string bass, mandolin-guitarophone
Bill Cuomo - Hammond organ
Stuart Duncan - fiddle
Dave Durocher - drums on tracks 2, 5, 7
Ray Flacke - electric guitar on tracks 2, 5, 7
Paul Franklin - steel guitar
Ray Herndon - background vocals
John Barlow Jarvis - keyboards
Paul Kennerley - background vocals
Kostas - background vocals
Larry Marrs - bass guitar on tracks 2, 5, 7, background vocals
Alan O'Bryant - background vocals
Mark O'Connor - fiddle
Les & Janice Reynolds – hand claps
Harry Stinson - drums
Marty Stuart - lead vocals, acoustic guitar, electric guitar, mandolin
Billy Thomas - background vocals
Glenn Worf - bass guitar

Charts

Weekly charts

Year-end charts

Singles

Sources

1991 albums
Marty Stuart albums
MCA Records albums
Albums produced by Tony Brown (record producer)
Albums produced by Richard Bennett (guitarist)